Jan-Pelle Hoppe (born 7 June 1999) is a German professional footballer who plays as a forward for FC Eintracht Norderstedt 03.

Career
Hoppe made his debut in the 3. Liga for Chemnitzer FC on 21 July 2019, coming on as a substitute in the 90th minute for Dejan Božić in the 1–1 home draw against Waldhof Mannheim.

On 10 January 2020, Hoppe moved to Kickers Offenbach on a deal until June 2021.

References

External links
 
 

1999 births
Living people
People from Varel
German footballers
Footballers from Lower Saxony
Association football forwards
3. Liga players
Regionalliga players
VfB Oldenburg players
SV Werder Bremen II players
Chemnitzer FC players
Kickers Offenbach players
VfB Germania Halberstadt players
Berliner FC Dynamo players
FC Eintracht Norderstedt 03 players